Ruslana Kyrychenko (born 22 February 1975) is a Ukrainian basketball player. She competed in the women's tournament at the 1996 Summer Olympics.

References

External links
 

1975 births
Living people
Ukrainian women's basketball players
Olympic basketball players of Ukraine
Basketball players at the 1996 Summer Olympics
People from Bila Tserkva
Sportspeople from Kyiv Oblast